Wichita Falls Regional Airport  is a public and military use airport six miles north of Wichita Falls in Wichita County, Texas. Its runways and taxiways are shared with Sheppard Air Force Base; most operations are military, but American Eagle flies to Dallas/Fort Worth International Airport.

The National Plan of Integrated Airport Systems for 2011–2015 categorized it as a primary commercial service airport. Federal Aviation Administration records say the airport had 47,191 passenger boardings (enplanements) in calendar year 2008, 43,952 in 2009 and 44,296 in 2010.

History
In January 1928,  of land, along what was then called Burkburnett Road, was purchased from J.A. Kemp in order to build Wichita Falls' first-ever airport. Construction of airplane hangars began later than month, designed by Charles Reid of the engineering firm of Reid and Costley. C.W. Calhoun was the first president of the Wichita Falls Airport Corporation. The airport was originally named Kell Field, in honor of Frank Kell, a prominent financier and builder from Wichita Falls.  The airport opened on July 4, 1928. Two U.S. Army airplanes from Brooks Air Force Base in San Antonio were the first airplanes to land at the airport. Originally operated as a privately owned airport, the airport was later sold to the City of Wichita Falls.<ref>"Airport Deed Handed City". '"Times Record News (Wichita Falls, Texas). July 28, 1928. p. 14.</ref>

Braniff Airways first provided service to Wichita Falls Municipal Airport beginning on November 13, 1930. Braniff asked the Civil Aeronautics Board for authority to discontinue service in 1969. The Civil Aeronautics Board approved its request to discontinue service because Braniff, in 1966, had begun operating the route with its new BAC One-11 Fastback Jets, which seated twice as many passengers as the previous propeller-powered Convair 340 and 440, which had served the route. As a result, Load Factors were not sufficient to continue the service and it was discontinued on May 7, 1969.

Continental Airlines served Wichita Falls Municipal Airport until 1977. Continental Airlines asked the Civil Aeronautics Board to approve its request to end its service at the airport and have Metro Airlines serve the airport instead. At the time, Continental Airlines served a Wichita Falls–Lawton–Oklahome City route. After originally disapproving the request, the Civil Aeronautics Board approved the change. Metro Airlines started serving Wichita Falls on October 30, 1977, with flights serving Lawton, Oklahoma City, and Tulsa. By 1979, Metro Airlines had flights to Dallas–Fort Worth Regional Airport and Houston Intercontinental Airport. 

Rio Airways started service to Wichita Falls in 1971."Rio Airways Stops Wichita Falls Flights". Times Record News (Wichita Falls, Texas). February 14, 1987. p. 9. After signing an agreement with Delta Airlines, its flights were branded Delta Connection. Rio Airways discontinued service to Wichita Falls in 1987 due to few passengers aboard its flights.

As of 1980, passengers flying from Wichita Falls to Dallas and connecting to an American Airlines flight could check in at Metro Airlines' ticket counter in Wichita Falls for both of their flights. This was the first time American Airlines had offered such an arrangement.  Metro Airlines service between Wichita Falls and Dallas was rebranded as American Eagle starting in 1985. 

Texas Star Airlines began providing service from Wichita Falls and Dallas Love Field, Austin, Fort Worth Meacham Airport, and Brownsville in 1981.Webre, Jim (September 4, 1981). "Wichita Falls-Austin Routes Sought By Airline". Times Record News (Wichita Falls, Texas). p. 1. Two years later, it discontinued all service at Wichita Falls, saying the service was no longer worthwhile with one or two passengers on average on each flight.

Trans-Central Airlines served Wichita Falls for a few months before it went out of business in 1984. Air Spirit Airlines also served Wichita Falls for a few months before it went out of business in 1985.

Atlantic Southeast Airlines began serving Wichita Falls, branded as Delta Connection, in 1986, with flights to Dallas–Fort Worth."Ariline Revenue Up". Wichita Falls Times. October 29, 1986. p. 19. Atlantic Southeast Airlines ended these flights in 2001 due to a lack of profitability. This left American Airlines as the only carrier offering scheduled commercial service to Wichita Falls.

Facilities
It has four runways:
 15R/33L is 13,100 by 300 feet (3,993 x 91 m) concrete; 
 15C/33C is 10,002 by 150 feet (3,049 x 46 m) asphalt/concrete; 
 15L/33R is 6,000 by 150 feet (1,829 x 46 m) asphalt/concrete; 
 17/35 is 7,021 by 150 feet (2,140 x 46 m) asphalt.

In the year ending September 30, 2020 the airport had 202,034 aircraft operations, average 553 per day: 97% military, <2% general aviation, and 2% airline. 213 aircraft were then based at this airport: 200 military, 3 single-engine, 9 multi-engine, and 1 jet.

Airline and destination

See also
 Kickapoo Downtown Airport

References

External links
 Wichita Falls Regional Airport
 Wichita Falls Regional (SPS) at Texas DOT airport directory
 Aerial image as of January 1995 from USGS The National Map''
 
 

Airports in Texas
Transportation in Wichita County, Texas
Buildings and structures in Wichita County, Texas